Colonel John James McIntosh Shaw  (1885 – 10 September 1940) was a Scottish 20th-century military surgeon who served in both World Wars, and pioneered plastic surgery in the 1920s.

Early life and education

Shaw was born in Port Glasgow in 1885 the son of Isabella McIntosh (1844–1937) and her husband, John Shaw (1838–1896), a consulting engineer. His family moved to 6 Jessfield Terrace in  Newhaven, Edinburgh when he was young. He was educated at George Watson's College.

In 1902 he entered the University of Edinburgh studying for general degree, graduating with an MA in 1906. He then continued at the University, studying medicine, graduating with a MB ChB in 1909. After practical experience he gained his doctorate (MD) in 1913.

Career 
In the World War I he served as a Major in the Royal Army Medical Corps attached to the Royal Artillery. He won the Military Cross, Croix de Guerre with star and was twice mentioned in dispatches.

After the war (and as a consequence of his experience) he began to specialise in plastic surgery, initially focussing on war-wounded. He was also one of the several to practice x-ray therapy on malignant diseases. He also lectured in Clinical Surgery at the University of Edinburgh.

In 1931 he was elected a Fellow of the Royal Society of Edinburgh. His proposers were James Lorrain Smith, Sir David Wilkie, George Barger and Francis Gibson Baily.

In the World War II he was Consultant Surgeon in the Field to the British Army for the Middle East. He died of acute dysentery in Cairo on 10 September 1940. He is buried in the Cairo War Memorial Cemetery – grave P253.

Family

He was married to Mina Draper Shaw (b.1899). They lived in Barnton, Edinburgh. They had eight children.

Publications

Note on Two Gunshot Wounds (1918)
War Injuries to Face and Jaw

References

1885 births
1940 deaths
People from Port Glasgow
People educated at George Watson's College
Alumni of the University of Edinburgh
British plastic surgeons
Recipients of the Military Cross
Recipients of the Croix de Guerre (France)
Fellows of the Royal Society of Edinburgh
British Army personnel of World War I
Royal Army Medical Corps officers
Scottish surgeons
Scottish military personnel
20th-century surgeons
British Army personnel killed in World War II
Deaths from dysentery